The Flintstones aired from 1960 to 1966. As of September 2006, all six seasons have been released on DVD in North America. In all, 166 episodes were released for the original series.

Series overview

Episodes
The first 2 seasons were written by Warren Foster, Michael Maltese and Arthur Phillips.

Pilot (1959)

Season 1 (1960–61)

Season 2 (1961–62)

Season 3 (1962–63)
The intro changes this season (starting with "Barney the Invisible"). This time around starting with Fred leaving work and meeting Wilma and Dino to go the Bedrock Drive-In Theater.

Season 4 (1963–64)
The intro changes twice in this season. In the early episodes, Pebbles is added into the intro. Starting with "Big League Freddie", the Rubbles (including Bamm Bamm) are added.

Season 5 (1964–65)
Gerry Johnson replaces Bea Benaderet as the voice of Betty Rubble starting with this season.

Season 6 (1965–66)

References

External links
 

Episodes
Lists of American adult animated television series episodes
Lists of American sitcom episodes